The 18"/48 caliber Mark 1 – United States Naval Gun was the initial name and design for a large caliber naval gun in the early 1920s. After the start of World War II, the gun was again relined to 18" and tested with a new Super Heavy Shell. The gun in its final form is currently displayed at the Dahlgren Naval Weapons Facility in Virginia.

Description
After World War I, the erstwhile allies were poised to start a massive and costly naval arms race, with the United Kingdom, United States, and Japan creating plans for large fleets of new battleships and battlecruisers. The 18"/48 cal Mark 1, designed in 1920, was the result of the progression to larger and more heavily armed capital ships. The gun prototype was halfway completed when the Washington Naval Treaty of 1922 prohibited the development of guns larger than 16-inches. Consequently, the prototype was converted to a long barrel 16-inch gun and thus never fired in its original design configuration.

Despite the treaty, battleship studies conducted in 1927-1928 had considered this gun, but was rejected due to excessive weight, very short liner life, and poor deck penetrating capability. The gun's size and weight meant that fewer 18-inch guns could be carried than 16-inch gun on a ship of a given size, while the large size and weight of the shells also reduced rate of fire.

16"/56 caliber Mark 4
The 18"/48 cal Mark 1 was finished with an extra thick 16-inch liner, and the resulting weapon became the 16"/56 cal Mark 4. The gun was first tested at the Dahlgren proving grounds in 1927, with tests continuing into the 1930s. The high muzzle velocity of the prototype resulted in very short liner life of only 45 rounds, with a predicted liner life of 125 full charge rounds for the service weapon.

18"/47 caliber Mark A
In 1938, with Japan's refusal to sign the Second London Naval Treaty and worsening situation in Europe and Asia, battleship studies once again considered 18-inch caliber main guns.

Ultimately, the General Board decided that a 16"/50 cal gun offered the best combination of performance and weight, and the new 16"/50 caliber Mark 7 gun was used by the  design. The preeminence of naval aviation ended further developments into large caliber naval guns.

While the 18"/47 cal Mark A was used to test the new "Super Heavy" 18-inch AP shell, if the caliber had been selected, a new lightweight 18"/48 cal Mark 2 gun would have been built. The new lightweight 18-inch gun would have fired the 3,850 lb "Super Heavy" shell at  muzzle velocity, with a design similar to the contemporary 16"/50 cal Mark 7 gun rather than the 1920s technology used in the 18"/47 cal Mark A construction.

While the development of large caliber naval guns ceased after World War 2, the gun was subsequently used for the development of low-drag aerial bombs. In this role, the gun fired a total of 114 shots, with the final shot fired on 7 November 1957. With the conclusion of testing, the gun was placed on display at the Dahlgren Naval Weapons Facility in Virginia.

Construction
The built-up gun is constructed of liner, a tube, jacket, nine hoops, six locking rings, a separate yoke ring and screw box liner. The breech mechanism was a down-swinging Welin block with vertical lever operating gear. Chromium plating of the bore was considered in the 1940s but never carried out.

See also
List of naval guns
List of World War II artillery
46 cm/45 Type 94 naval gun
List of the largest cannon by caliber

References

External links
18"/48 (45.7 cm) Mark 1, 16"/56 (40.6 cm) Mark 4, 18"/47 (45.7 cm) Mark A
History of the U.S. Navy’s Only 18-inch Gun

Naval guns of the United States
World War II naval weapons
400 mm artillery
460 mm artillery
Military equipment introduced in the 1920s